Starý Plzenec is a town in Plzeň-City District in the Plzeň Region of the Czech Republic. It has about 5,200 inhabitants.

Administrative parts
The village of Sedlec is an administrative part of Starý Plzenec.

Geography

It lies in the Švihov Highlands. The Úslava River flows through the town.

History
The first written mention of the settlement is from a chronicle of Thietmar of Merseburg and dates to 976, when Boleslaus II, Duke of Bohemia defeated a Bavarian army below a local stronghold, then called Plzeň. The urban settlement below the castle evolved into an administrative and mercantile centre of western Bohemia, but this came to an end in 1295 when King Wenceslaus II founded the new city of Plzeň in a more suitable location at the nearby confluence of the Mže and Radbuza rivers. The new city soon took over the functions of old Plzeň and became known as Nová Plzeň (New Plzeň), later simply as Plzeň, while the older settlement on the Úslava river was called Stará Plzeň (Old Plzeň) and since then, in a more recent variant, Starý Plzenec.

Demographics

Economy

Starý Plzenec is known for the sparkling wine producer, Bohemia Sekt company. It is the biggest sparking wine producer in the Czech Republic and one of the biggest in Central and Eastern Europe. The production started here in 1943 in the premises of the former brewery, which was active in 1873–1929.

Sights

Radyně Castle is a ruin of a medieval castle from the 14th century open to the public, located on the Radyně Hill above the town (to the south).

On Hůrka Hill above the town there are the Rotunda of Saints Peter and Paul, a Romanesque church from the late 10th century, and the foundations of other buildings of the old gord. Since 1978, the area has been protected as a national cultural monument.

Notable people
Filip Jícha (born 1982), handballer

References

External links

Cities and towns in the Czech Republic
Populated places in Plzeň-South District